The 2019–20 Liga IV Vrancea (known as Superliga Altdorf Tehnik for sponsorship reasons) was the 52nd season of Liga IV Vrancea, the fourth tier of the Romanian football league system. The season began on 14 September 2019 and was scheduled to end in June 2020, but was suspended in March because of the COVID-19 pandemic in Romania. 

The season was ended officially on 17 July 2020 after AJF Vrancea (County Football Association) concluding that the teams could not meet the medical conditions for matches at this level, without awarding the title of county champion, and the representative of Vrancea County at the promotion play-off to Liga III will be the Victoria Gugești, the only team that announced that it can comply with the conditions imposed by the medical protocol.

Team changes 
 FCM Adjud, Mausoleul Mărășești, Voința Cârligele, Voința Răstoaca did not enter in the competition.
 Voința Slobozia Ciorăști, Unirea Milcovul, Național Golești, Siretul Suraia were enrolled in Liga IV due to the lack of teams.

Competition format
The league consisted of 16 teams divided into 3 groups, Group A with 6 teams, Group B with 5 teams and Group C with 5 teams and will play a regular season, followed by a play-off.

League tables

Group A

Group B

Group C

Championship play-off

Promotion play-off

Champions of Liga IV – Vrancea County face champions of Liga IV – Brăila County and Liga IV – Galați County.

Region 7 (South–East)

Group A

See also

Main Leagues
 2019–20 Liga I
 2019–20 Liga II
 2019–20 Liga III
 2019–20 Liga IV

County Leagues (Liga IV series)

 2019–20 Liga IV Alba
 2019–20 Liga IV Arad
 2019–20 Liga IV Argeș
 2019–20 Liga IV Bacău
 2019–20 Liga IV Bihor
 2019–20 Liga IV Bistrița-Năsăud
 2019–20 Liga IV Botoșani
 2019–20 Liga IV Brăila
 2019–20 Liga IV Brașov
 2019–20 Liga IV Bucharest
 2019–20 Liga IV Buzău
 2019–20 Liga IV Călărași
 2019–20 Liga IV Caraș-Severin
 2019–20 Liga IV Cluj
 2019–20 Liga IV Constanța
 2019–20 Liga IV Covasna
 2019–20 Liga IV Dâmbovița
 2019–20 Liga IV Dolj 
 2019–20 Liga IV Galați
 2019–20 Liga IV Giurgiu
 2019–20 Liga IV Gorj
 2019–20 Liga IV Harghita
 2019–20 Liga IV Hunedoara
 2019–20 Liga IV Ialomița
 2019–20 Liga IV Iași
 2019–20 Liga IV Ilfov
 2019–20 Liga IV Maramureș
 2019–20 Liga IV Mehedinți
 2019–20 Liga IV Mureș
 2019–20 Liga IV Neamț
 2019–20 Liga IV Olt
 2019–20 Liga IV Prahova
 2019–20 Liga IV Sălaj
 2019–20 Liga IV Satu Mare
 2019–20 Liga IV Sibiu
 2019–20 Liga IV Suceava
 2019–20 Liga IV Teleorman
 2019–20 Liga IV Timiș
 2019–20 Liga IV Tulcea
 2019–20 Liga IV Vâlcea
 2019–20 Liga IV Vaslui

References

External links
 Official website 

Liga IV seasons
Sport in Vrancea County